Lincoln railway station (previously Lincoln Central) serves the city of Lincoln in Lincolnshire, England. The station is owned by Network Rail and managed by East Midlands Railway. East Midlands Railway provides the majority of services from the station, with other services being provided by Northern and London North Eastern Railway.

The station is part of the PlusBus scheme, where train and bus tickets can be bought together at a saving. Lincoln Central bus station, the city's main bus station, is within a couple of minutes' walk from the railway station and is located to the north-east of the station and easily accessed via a pedestrian crossing and pedestrianised plaza.

History
The station buildings were designed by John Henry Taylor of London in 1848, for the Great Northern Railway company. It is built in a Tudor revival style of yellow brick, with stone dressings and slate roofs, with 6 ridge and 8 side wall stacks. The buildings and footbridge were Grade II listed in 1990.

Despite this, the station retained its "Central" suffix until 2019. The station's "welcome" message, recorded by East Midlands Trains, still refers to the station as Lincoln Central.

In late-2010, East Midlands Trains announced that it intended to develop an improved customer service area and improve the café and toilets.

Platform layout
The station has a total of 5 platforms, numbered 1-5:
 Platforms 1 and 2 are bay platforms used for daytime stabling of trains and for terminating arrivals from the east which will return east (trains arriving from the east which will form westbound services will be routed into one of the through platforms).
 Platforms 3, 4 and 5 are bidirectional through platforms used for services on all routes. All three through platforms are used in whichever way is most operationally advantageous.
 Platform 3 is the platform face adjacent the main station building and is nearest to the station entrance. The ticket barriers, buffet/shop, a waiting room, accessible toilet and staff facilities are all sited on platform 3.
 Platforms 4 and 5 are the two faces of the island platform. Passenger waiting rooms and toilets are on the island platform, as is the staff conference room.

Services 
Train services at Lincoln are operated by East Midlands Railway, Northern Trains and London North Eastern Railway.

Services at the station are as follows:

East Midlands Railway

East Midlands Railway operate the majority of services at Lincoln. Off-peak, they operate an hourly service to  via  and an hourly service to  via .

On Sundays, the service to Leicester runs only as far as Nottingham and there is no service to Peterborough, Doncaster or London. In the Summer months, there are 3 trains per day between Nottingham and Cleethorpes but no service on this route in the winter.

Northern Trains

On Sundays, this service runs to  instead of Leeds and calls at all stations between Worksop and Sheffield.

London North Eastern Railway

London North Eastern Railway operate direct services every 2 hours to  via the East Coast Main Line.

Development work

Resignalling

Network Rail instituted a major resignalling scheme for Lincoln during the years 2007–2008 which saw: 
 the replacement of the semaphore signals with colour light signals,
 the concentration of all signalling control into one signal box rather than the previous four,
 track relaying, and ballasting
 new points and crossovers which allow all three through platforms at Lincoln to be used in both directions and allows trains from the east to enter the two bay platforms (1 & 2) directly.

As a direct result, terminating trains no longer need to shunt from one side of the station to the other to take up their return workings, reducing turnaround times for terminating trains and improve train service punctuality and reliability.

As part of the overall scheme, Lincoln's platforms have been renumbered from 3–7 to 1–5: (the current platform 1 was previously platform 3, 2 was 4 etc.)

All four existing signal boxes – High Street, East Holmes, West Holmes and Pelham Street Junction – were closed and replaced by a new state of the art signalling centre near the West Holmes box. Pelham Street and West Holmes boxes were demolished, but the High Street and East Holmes boxes are listed buildings and are preserved.

Current and future development
Lincoln is included in the Lincoln Transport Hub redevelopment scheme, with aims to improve connectivity between bus and rail services in Lincoln by the construction of a new bus station adjacent to the railway station, alongside improvements to the railway station itself, including a new pedestrianised plaza outside the main entrance on St Mary's Street. Construction of the Transport Hub commenced in August 2016 and was completed in January 2018.

There are also plans for improvements to the railway station itself, alongside the construction of a new footbridge over the railway line from Tentercroft Street into the city centre to increase the connectivity of the city centre on foot and by cycle.

In addition to this, there is currently construction of a coffee shop within the station premises.

Future services
For many years, Lincoln had not been served with a direct rail service to London. However, the awarding of two new rail franchises saw this remedied.

On 14 August 2007, it was announced that National Express East Coast (NXEC) would take over the InterCity East Coast franchise in December 2007. As part of the commitment, NXEC planned to introduce a two-hourly service between Lincoln and London King's Cross, starting in 2009. The InterCity East Coast Franchise was passed to East Coast in November 2009.
In late 2009 East Coast along with NetworkRail published details of the ECML proposed new timetable, including the Lincoln-London services.  In spring 2010 it was announced that this new service would be cut back. East Coast, citing financial restraints during the credit crunch, announced instead just one direct train in each direction per day, with extra services running only as far as Newark North Gate station, meaning Lincoln passengers will still have to change trains there.  On 22 May 2011 East Coast started direct Lincoln-London Kings Cross services, albeit in a much reduced number than they had originally planned. There is one train a day to London leaving Lincoln at 07:30 Monday-Friday and 07:33 on Saturday, there is no East Coast Service to London on a Sunday. The return service leaves London at 19:06  Monday-Friday, 18.08 on Saturday, and 19.08 on Sunday. The operation passed over to Virgin Trains East Coast in early 2015 and as of June 2018 the King's Cross service is now operated by London North Eastern Railway. LNER have started running two-hourly trains between Lincoln and King's Cross.

In addition to the London North Eastern Railway service, East Midlands Railway operate one train per day Monday-Saturday from Lincoln to London St Pancras, with a return journey in the evening.

The new Northern franchise started in April 2016 had service improvements on the Lincoln line – the service frequency to Sheffield & Retford was increased to twice hourly during the week, and to hourly on Sundays in 2019, whilst the Lincoln to Sheffield service was incorporated into Arriva Rail North's Northern Connect regional network and extended to  via Barnsley.

The service never began operation, and all trace was removed from the Renaissance website in 2009, implying that the service was no longer being pursued.

Nottinghamshire County Council, the Department for Transport and Network Rail are in discussion about various improvements to the line towards Nottingham including a doubling of service.

In April 2019, the new East Midlands Railway franchise was awarded, which included several key improvements for services in Lincoln. The existing  to Grimsby service would instead terminate at Lincoln. On 9 May 2019, following the end of the standstill period, Abellio confirmed they planned to extend the Leicester service to Grimsby Town.

Accidents and incidents
On 3 June 1962, an express passenger train was derailed due to excessive speed on a curve. Three people were killed and 49 were injured.

References

Further reading

External links

Buildings and structures in Lincoln, England
Railway stations in Lincolnshire
Former Great Northern Railway stations
Railway stations in Great Britain opened in 1848
Railway stations served by East Midlands Railway
Northern franchise railway stations
Railway stations served by London North Eastern Railway
John Henry Taylor railway stations
Grade II listed buildings in Lincolnshire
DfT Category C1 stations